Point Vicente Lighthouse is a lighthouse in Rancho Palos Verdes, California, United States, north of Los Angeles Harbor. It is between Point Loma Lighthouse to the south and Point Conception Lighthouse to the north. The lighthouse was added to the National Register of Historic Places in 1980. The lighthouse is owned by the United States federal government and is managed by the United States Coast Guard. It is not usually open to the public, but the Coast Guard Auxiliary run tours once per month and it is used annually for the city's "Whale of a Day" festival.

History
Point Vicente Lighthouse was built in 1926, following years of complaints by shippers about the dangerous waters around the Palos Verdes peninsula. In 1934 the Long Beach Radio Station opened in a neighboring building, which was used to monitor for distress signals. The light source was dimmed to just 25 watts during World War II to avoid aiding the enemy. It was automated in 1971, and the radio station was closed in 1980. In 2015, the Coast Guard announced its intention to replace the original third order lens with an LED light with a 14 nm range, replacing the current light and lens. In February 2019 the lens was removed from the light room.

The Point Vicente Lighthouse is just north of the entrances to the Los Angeles/Long Beach Harbors. It was operated and maintained by the United States Lighthouse Service prior to that Service being merged with the U.S. Coast Guard, which was delegated all aid-to-navigation responsibilities in 1939. The lighthouse was manned until 1971 when it was automated by a remote electronic aids-to-navigation monitoring system.

The Coast Guard Light List specifies its light characteristic as being a pair of two white flashes, repeating that pair every 20 seconds. An emergency light of reduced intensity operates if the main light is extinguished.

The most striking feature in the lighthouse was the classical third-order rotating Fresnel Lens located in the lantern. This particular lens was manufactured around 1910 in Paris, France, by Barbier, Benard, et Turenne, the oldest lens making company in the world. This lens is made up of hand-ground prisms held in place by a cast brass frame. The prisms and frame represent an excellent example of the precision achieved by optical scientists and the lens making art in utilizing the known principles and properties of light. Now removed from the lantern room, the lens is on display at the Point Vicente Interpretive Center.

This lighthouse once incorporated a pleasant-sounding foghorn to audibly warn ships during times of low visibility which are common to the area. The foghorn was dismantled in the early 2000s.

Keepers
Head
 George W. L'Hommedieu (1925–1930)
 Anton Trittinger (1930–1945)
 Joseph May (1945–1955)

Modern day usage
The Point Vicente Lighthouse that is typically open for tours on the second Saturday of each month, 10am to 3pm PST. is currently closed.  The lighthouse and grounds are federal property owned and operated by the United States Coast Guard.

In addition to the Lighthouse & USCG Museum, the property includes three houses, Coast Guard residences that formerly housed personnel.

The US Coast Guards Aids to Navigation Team Los Angeles/Long Beach (CG ANT LA/LB) is in charge of operation and maintenance of the Lighthouse and Fresnel Lens. Members from the US Coast Guard Auxiliary who are also members of the CG ANT LA/LB are in charge of the tours and open houses at the lighthouse. These members are recognized as Lighthouse Keepers by the USCG Auxiliary and Technicians by the CG.

The United States Naval Sea Cadet Corps assists at the open houses at the entrance gate access, in the Lighthouse and USCG museum, and perimeter sentry, keeping the public away from restricted areas. Some restricted areas include the lighthouse top floor (lantern room), the lawn, and the two streets leading to the USCG houses. The non-restricted areas include the lighthouse (except lantern room), museum, and street leading to lighthouse.

Parking is available outside the entrance gate. Only vehicles authorized by the USCG are allowed on the property. There are no public restrooms on the property. The nearest public restrooms are at the city's Point Vicente Interpretive Center next door. Admission to the lighthouse is free.

In popular culture

The light has been a popular filming location going back to the 1958 TV series Sea Hunt, and has been seen in episodes of The A-Team, Emergency!, Fantasy Island, and Wonder Woman in the 70s and 80s, to episodes of The Amazing Race, CSI, Doll & Em, and NCIS in the 2010s and 2020s.

In film, the light has been used as a filming location in the 2001 film Pearl Harbor and the 2017 Dunkirk.

Gallery

See also

 List of lighthouses in the United States

References

Notes

External links

 official Point Vicente Lighthouse website
 Lighthouse Cam

Lighthouse museums in California
Museums in Los Angeles County, California
Palos Verdes Peninsula
History of Los Angeles
Lighthouses completed in 1926
Lighthouses on the National Register of Historic Places in California
Buildings and structures on the National Register of Historic Places in Los Angeles County, California
Lighthouses in Los Angeles County, California